Sir David Baird, 3rd Baronet, of Newbyth, DL (26 January 1832 – 12 October 1913) was a Scottish army officer and landowner.

Life 
David Baird was born on 21 January 1832 in Prestonkirk, Haddingtonshire to Sir David Baird, 2nd Baronet, and Lady Anne Kennedy. He was baptised on 26 January. He succeeded his father in the baronetcy as the eldest surviving son in 1852. 

Baird served as an officer with the 74th Regiment of Foot in the Xhosa Wars of 1851–1852, in the Crimean War, and was on Lord Clyde's staff during the Indian Mutiny. He was subsequently a captain in the 98th Regiment of Foot, and was promoted to be major in the 74th Highlanders.  

Baird was a member of two famous London clubs: the Army and Navy Club, and White's Club. He was also Deputy Lieutenant for the counties of East Lothian and Midlothian. 

Baird died at his Scottish residence at Preston Kirby, Haddingtonshire, on 12 October 1913, at the age of 81. He had been ill for some time, and on the Saturday prior underwent an operation. He is buried with his wife in Whitekirk graveyard in East Lothian.

Family 

Sir David married Ellen, daughter and heiress of Charles Stuart, 12th Lord Blantyre, in 1864. Around the turn of the century they inherited Lennoxlove House near Haddington and settled Newbyth House upon his son and heir David Baird (1865–1941).

See also 
 Baird baronets

References

Sources 

 "Death of Sir David Baird". The Glasgow Herald. Friday, 9 January 1852. p. 5.
 "Death of Sir David Baird: Famous Scottish Baronet and Soldier". The Manchester Courier. Tuesday, 14 October 1913. p. 8.
 "Sir David Baird". The Daily Telegraph. Tuesday, 14 October 1913. p. 8.
 "Sir David Baird, 3rd Bt". National Portrait Gallery. Accessed 24 February 2022.
 "The Marriage of Sir David Baird and the Hon. Ellen Stuart". The Morning Post. Thursday, 16 June 1864. p. 5.

1832 births
1913 deaths
Baronets in the Baronetage of the United Kingdom
People from East Lothian
74th Highlanders officers
98th Regiment of Foot officers
British Army personnel of the Crimean War
British military personnel of the Indian Rebellion of 1857
Deputy Lieutenants of East Lothian
Deputy Lieutenants of Midlothian